Pitambari Debi (born 12 June 1904, in Puri) was an Indian writer of Odia literature, best remembered for coauthoring the Lexicon of the Oriya Language, and her book Kantara Babu (1931).

References 

1904 births

Year of death missing
Indian writers
Indian lexicographers